NT Almirante Gastão Motta is an Almirante Gastão Motta-class replenishment oiler of the Brazilian Navy. The Almirante Gastão Motta was ordered by the Brazilian Navy on 15 December 1987. The ship was launched on 1 July 1990, and was commissioned on 26 November 1991.

History
In June 2009, Almirante Gastão Motta participated in the recovery mission for the wreckage of Air France Flight 447.

References

External links

Auxiliary ships of the Brazilian Navy
Ships built in Brazil
1990 ships